Tevfik Odabasi (born November 20, 1981) is a freestyle wrestler from Turkey. He studied at Kırıkkale University.

Wrestling career 
He participated in Men's freestyle 60 kg at the 2004 Summer Olympics, where he was ranked in 15th place. In 2005, he won a silver medal at the Mediterranean Games in Almeria, Spain and another silver medal at the Summer Universiade in İzmir, Turkey. He also participated in Men's freestyle 60 kg at the 2008 Summer Olympics losing in the 1/16 of final with Murad Ramazanov.

References

External links
 

Living people
1981 births
Olympic wrestlers of Turkey
Wrestlers at the 2008 Summer Olympics
Wrestlers at the 2004 Summer Olympics
Kırıkkale University alumni
Turkish male sport wrestlers
Mediterranean Games silver medalists for Turkey
Competitors at the 2005 Mediterranean Games
Universiade medalists in wrestling
Mediterranean Games medalists in wrestling
Universiade silver medalists for Turkey
Medalists at the 2005 Summer Universiade
21st-century Turkish people